This article presents a list of the historical events and publications of Australian literature during 1984.

Events

 Tim Winton’s Shallows won the 1984 Miles Franklin Award

Major publications

Novels 
 Helen Garner, The Children's Bach
 David Ireland, Archimedes and the Seagle
 Elizabeth Jolley, Milk and Honey
 Jill Neville, Last Ferry to Manly
 Tim Winton, Shallows

Short story anthologies 
 John Morrison, Stories of the Waterfront

Children's and young adult fiction 
 James Aldridge, The True Story of Lilli Stubeck
 Emily Rodda, Something Special
 Nadia Wheatley, Dancing in the Anzac Deli

Poetry 
 Doris Brett, The Truth about Unicorns
 Rosemary Dobson, The Three Fates & Other Poems
 Robert Gray, The Skylight
 Kevin Hart, Your Shadow
 Dorothy Porter, The Night Parrot

Non-fiction 
Sylvia Lawson, The Archibald Paradox

Awards and honours
 Nancy Cato , for "service to Australian literature"
 John Manifold , for "service literature as a poet and musician
 Dorothy Auchterlonie Green , for "service to Australian literature"

Deaths 
A list, ordered by date of death (and, if the date is either unspecified or repeated, ordered alphabetically by surname) of deaths in 1984 of Australian literary figures, authors of written works or literature-related individuals follows, including year of birth.
21 January — Alan Marshall, writer, story teller, humanist and social documenter (born 1902)
12 March — Peg Maltby, artist, book illustrator and children's writer (born 1899 in England)
6 June — A. Bertram Chandler, mariner-turned-science fiction writer (born 1912)
24 June — Francis Brabazon, poet and member of Meher Baba's mandali (born 1907)
15 August — Donald Friend, artist and diarist (born 1914)
29 September — Hal Porter, novelist, playwright, poet and short story writer (1911)
10 November —Xavier Herbert, writer (born 1901)
23 December — Joan Lindsay, novelist, playwright, essayist and visual artist (born 1896)

See also 
 1984 in Australia
 1984 in literature
 1984 in poetry
 List of years in literature
 List of years in Australian literature

References

1984 in Australia
Australian literature by year
20th-century Australian literature
1984 in literature